The 1968 Senior League World Series took place from August 13–18 in Gary, Indiana, United States. New Hyde Park, New York defeated West Tampa, Florida in the championship game. It was the third straight title for New York. This was the first SLWS held in Gary.

Teams

Results

References

Senior League World Series
Senior League World Series
Baseball competitions in Indiana
Sports in Gary, Indiana
1968 in sports in Indiana